The siege of Gijón, one of the first actions in the Spanish Civil War, saw the anarchist militia crushing a small Nationalist garrison in Gijón, between 19 July and 16 August 1936. The militia – nominally fighting in defense of the Republic – laid siege to the Simancas barracks in the city of Gijón. These were defended by about 180 soldiers and Guardia Civil officers who had risen in support of General Franco's rebellion and seized the post for the Nationalists. The battle was remarkable for its viciousness and the stubbornness of the besieged.

Background
The Nationalist uprising of July 1936 fared poorly in Asturias, a province overwhelmingly hostile to Franco and controlled almost from the outset of the war by a curious but effective council of state officials, technicians, and mine workers. CNT and UGT membership in Asturias totalled around 70,000, forming the backbone of a disciplined militia.

Against such opposition the military governor of Gijón, Colonel Antonio Pinilla, dared not to declare his loyalty to Franco. Very few were fooled, and by late July his outpost was surrounded and cut off from General Emilio Mola's Army of the North by several hundred miles of enemy territory. 
The Nationalist cruiser Almirante Cervera could have supported the rebel troops with her 6in main guns from the sea, but this offered no real hope of relief.

The siege
The battle for Gijón was marked by Pinilla's unwavering resistance and by the almost total lack of weapons - excepting dynamite - of the attackers. Until they secured Gijón's fall the Republicans could not concentrate their full numbers in their siege against the Nationalists in Oviedo; accordingly, their attacks were unrelenting.

The defenders soon ran out of water and went mad with thirst. Pinilla refused to give in, believing, from the distorted reports of Nationalist propaganda, that relief was imminent. As at the concurrent siege of the Alcázar in Toledo, the Anarchists abducted Pinilla's son and threatened to slay him if the defenders refused to surrender. Like his counterpart José Moscardó Ituarte, Pinilla was unmoved.

In mid-August the miners stormed the barracks, hurling dynamite as they charged. The barracks burned and the Nationalist defence crumbled. Rather than surrender, Pinilla sent a radio message to the Almirante Cervera, ordering it to open fire on his position, the order was obeyed and  the last defenders of Simancas barracks died in the flames.

See also 

 List of Spanish Republican military equipment of the Spanish Civil War
 List of Spanish Nationalist military equipment of the Spanish Civil War

Notes

References
 

Gijon
Gijon
Gijon
Gijon
1936 in Spain
July 1936 events
August 1936 events